Telcom is an Irish telecommunications company operating in the business-to-business market. They offer communications services, are a ComReg registered carrier for voice and data and operate as an independent Internet Service Provider. Telcom is a registered member of the Internet Neutral Exchange (INEX).

History 
Telcom was founded in 1999 in Dublin by Liam Tully. It initially provided phone systems for offices, before expanding to include data and internet services.

In 2015 Telcom invested €1 million into new network infrastructure, creating a 10Gb core network. This allowed them to expand their business fibre broadband service, offering speeds of up to 1 Gb/s to customers with zero contention rates. This upgrade was completed as a partnership between Telcom and Agile Networks, another Dublin-based company.

Services
Telcom provides various services to businesses, including:
 Managed Fibre Broadband
 Multiprotocol Label Switching (MPLS)
 SIP/VOIP
 ADSL/VDSL
 ISDN
 Voice telephony
 PBX Systems
 Teleconferencing systems
Clients using Telcom's services include Fyffes, Hertz, Maxol, Philips, Savills, Scotiabank, DZ Bank and the Higher Education Authority.

See also 
 Telecommunications in the Republic of Ireland
 Internet in the Republic of Ireland

References

External links 
 Official website

Telecommunications companies of Ireland
Telecommunications companies of the Republic of Ireland
Internet companies of Ireland
Telecommunications companies established in 1999
Irish companies established in 1999
VoIP companies of Ireland
Internet service providers of the Republic of Ireland
Companies based in Dublin (city)